Bishop Agricola was a 6th-century Bishop of Chalon-sur-Saône in France.

Signing himself as  Agroecola he was a signatory of the council of Orléans in 538, 541, 549, Council of Paris (552), and the Council of Lyon (570).

References

6th-century Frankish bishops
Year of birth unknown
Bishops of Chalon-sur-Saône